Ludwig Schmid-Wildy (3 May 1896 – 30 January 1982) was a German actor.

Selected filmography
 Um das Menschenrecht (1934)
 Shock Troop (1934)
 Storms in May (1938)
  Escape in the Dark (1939)
 Uproar in Damascus (1939)
 Enemies (1940)
 The Eternal Spring (1940)
 The Sinful Village (1940)
 A German Robinson Crusoe (1940)
 The Fire Devil (1940)
 Violanta (1942)
 The Eternal Tone (1943)
 The War of the Oxen (1943)
 Music in Salzburg (1944)
  The Crucifix Carver of Ammergau (1952)
 The Bachelor Trap (1953)
 Der Jäger von Fall (1956)
 The Beggar Student (1956)
 Marriages Forbidden (1957)
 Wir Wunderkinder (1958)
 Oh! This Bavaria! (1960)
 Student of the Bedroom (1970)
 Schwarzwaldfahrt aus Liebeskummer (1974)
 Zwei himmlische Dickschädel (1974)

References

External links
 

1896 births
1982 deaths
German male film actors
German male stage actors
Actors from North Rhine-Westphalia
People from Aachen
20th-century German male actors